Takht-e-Sulaiman ("Throne of Solomon") is a peak of the Sulaiman Mountains, located near the town of Darazinda in the Dera Ismail Khan Subdivision of Khyber Pakhtunkhwa, Pakistan. It is close to Dera Ismail Khan Subdivision's borders with both South Waziristan and Zhob, Balochistan. At , it is the highest peak in Dera Ismail Khan District and the greater Shirani region. Ibn Battuta named Takht-e-Sulaiman as Kōh-e Sulaymān, "Mount of Solomon".

Legends

A legend, recorded by the medieval Maghrebi explorer Ibn Battuta, has it that Prophet Solomon climbed this mountain and looked out over the land of Hindustan, which was then "covered with darkness", after staying on the peak, he turned back without descending into this new frontier, and left only the mountain which is named after him.

Another legend says that Qais Abdur Rashid, said to be the legendary ancestor of Pashtun people, is buried on top of Takht-e-Sulaiman, which gives the peak the local Pashto name of Da Kasī Ghar (د کسي غر, "Mountain of Qais").

Syed Muhammad Hamza Gesudaraz I is buried on the top of Takht-e-Sulaiman with his family and descendants. The burial is called “Meeran”.

Tourism and Economy 
Takht-e-Sulaiman is surrounded by olive groves and pine-nut (chalghoza) forests, and hosts wild animals like markhors, wolves, rabbits, eagles and partridges. Royalty from the Gulf Arab states are known to hunt precious birds in the region.

References

Further reading 

Sulaiman Mountains
Mountains of Balochistan (Pakistan)
Three-thousanders of the Hindu Kush